The COVID-19 pandemic has had a substantial impact on the television industry, mirroring its impacts across all arts sectors, shutting down or delaying production of television programs in many countries with consequent negative impacts on revenues (through rights and advertising sales) and employment.

Such measures and changes have been done to appeal to mandates for social distancing and stay-at-home orders, as well as commitments by production companies and broadcasters to maintain the safety of all involved in production.

Ampere Analysis projected that the pandemic had delayed at least 60% of scripted television programming worldwide, including at least half of the programming originally scheduled to air in the second half of 2020. There had been a noticeable increase in non-scripted productions—including smaller-scale series capable of being produced remotely—that can be used to fill schedules until scripted programs resume production (noting that audiences may eventually become tired out by pandemic-themed programming).

The animation industry remained largely unaffected, due to the ease of remote work by animators.

Production by region

Asia-Pacific

Australia 

On Network 10, The Project, the seventeenth season of Dancing with the Stars Australia, Studio 10, and the eighth season of Have You Been Paying Attention? suspended their in-studio audiences. Have You Been Paying Attention? was recorded with only Tom Gleisner and a handful of production crew filming the show from the South Yarra studio, with all of the contestants remote working and using videotelephony to enforce social distancing.

The Australian Survivor: All Stars reunion episode filmed without an audience and was hosted by Osher Günsberg, rather than the series' regular host Jonathan LaPaglia, due to travel restrictions. The eighth season of Australian Survivor, set to start filming in Fiji in April, was postponed following the federal government's decision to establish a Level 4 travel restrictions, heavily discouraging international travel (this was later upgraded to an outright ban of international travel). Network 10 also changed the race route for the fifth season of The Amazing Race Australia so that it would film only in Australia instead of internationally, but was later postponed due to interstate travel restrictions.

The eighth season of The Bachelor suspended filming midway into the season. Neighbours suspended filming for two days after a crew member came into contact with someone who had tested positive for coronavirus. Upon resuming production, Neighbours implemented new guidelines, including splitting its crews and avoiding intimate scenes between cast members.

On the ABC, Q&A, Shaun Micallef's Mad as Hell, and The Weekly with Charlie Pickering suspended their studio audiences.

The Nine Network's Australian Ninja Warrior excluded audiences from attending tapings, with exception of the contestants' family members. The Voice Australia postponed production due to international talent facing a two-week quarantine after arriving in Australia.

The eleventh season of Gogglebox Australia filmed as normal prior to the beginning of the pandemic, with changes made to the show once the pandemic reached Australia. On April 10, following the beginning of the pandemic in Australia, cast members Mick and Di announced that they would be self-isolating for the remainder of the season; whilst further changes to the show included Jad using video conferencing software on his laptop, allowing him to continue participating in the program with his best friend Matty and Sarah Marie (Matty's wife); and 91-year old Emily (of the Silbery family) self-isolating, whilst her daughter Kerry and granddaughter Isabelle remained in weekly episodes for the remainder of the season.

Filming on the Seven Network's Home and Away was suspended as of March 22. The network also removed the show from its schedule for three weeks and replaced it for the first two weeks with the news show The Latest, and for the third week with the first week of the 8th season of House Rules. Production resumed on May 25.

Australia's Got Talent postponed production due to international talent facing a fourteen-day quarantine after arriving in Australia.

The annual Channel Seven Perth Telethon, traditionally aired as a marathon 26 hour live broadcast, was instead reduced to two, 3 hour live primetime specials that aired on 24 and 25 October 2020. The specials had a greater focus on Western Australia-based performers and personalities due to interstate travel restrictions.

Indonesia 

As the government appeal Indonesians to "work, study, and pray at home", the Ministry of Education and Culture partners with TVRI to broadcast educational programming on a dedicated block Belajar dari Rumah on the network starting 13 April 2020. The block consists of kids program for preschools, instructional programming for elementary and high school students, and a parenting program on weekdays; as well as national movies at several weeknights and children, talkshow, and documentary programs at weekends. The block is aired every day at 08.00 to 11.00 WIB and 21.30 to 23.30 WIB on several weeknights, and also broadcast on TV Edukasi.

Japan 

A handful of anime studios have encouraged their employees to work from home although the employment of freelance animators in some studios has limited work disruption. Anime productions including A3! Season Spring & Summer, A Certain Scientific Railgun T, Infinite Dendrogram, Asteroid in Love, The Millionaire Detective Balance: Unlimited were delayed apparently due to the pandemic. Productions which heavily rely on outsourcing in-between and coloring work to studios in China were the most affected by the COVID-19 pandemic, due to international travel restrictions making it impossible to physically deliver works across national boundary in person.

On March 31, media outlets reported that Toei Company closed its Tokyo studio for disinfection after the lead actor of Mashin Sentai Kiramager, the 44th season of the long-time running Super Sentai series, Rio Komiya (Jūru Atsuta) tested positive for COVID-19 the previous day and halted production of the series. However, on April 3, Toei released a statement that the studio was not closed despite what news and media outlets reported, citing the news as misinformation. As of April 5, Komiya's health condition was improving, and four days later, Komiya was discharged from the hospital and self-quarantined for two weeks. On May 10, both Kiramager and Kamen Rider Zero-One, the 30th season of the long-time running Kamen Rider series was announced to be going on hiatus. In place of the standard weekly episodes, Kiramager will broadcast Episode ZERO, a prequel episode detailing events before the series, as well as the Director's Cut versions of the first two episodes, Kira Talk!, and the Jamental Institute. Kamen Rider Zero-One will be releasing five special episodes that recount the events of the episodes covered in the 35 episodes released before hiatus, with two of those episodes dubbed "President Special" that are from the perspective of Aruto Hiden and his secretary, Is, while the third episode dubbed "Shooting Special" will be from the perspective of Isamu Fuwa and Yua Yaiba. On May 27, it was reported that Kamen Rider Zero-One would resume filming on June 1 following Japan lifting its state-of-emergency declaration two days prior, albeit with new guidelines to be used while shooting the remaining episodes. On June 7, TV Asahi announced that Kiramager and Zero-One would return to their regular weekly episodes starting on June 21.

Not only anime series but also drama series suspended production to curb the spread of infection, and most broadcast stations transmitted works from their archives. In Nippon TV, the airing schedule of Haken no Hinkaku 2, starring Ryoko Shinohara and Yo Oizumi, has been postponed, as well as the airing schedule of Miman Keisatsu, starring Kento Nakajima and Sho Hirano, has been postponed. In Tokyo Broadcasting System Television, the airing schedule of MIU404, starring Gen Hoshino and Gou Ayano, has been postponed, as well as the airing schedule of Hanzawa Naoki 2, starring Masato Sakai and Mitsuhiro Oikawa, has been postponed. In Fuji TV, the airing schedule of Unsung Cinderella, starring Satomi Ishihara and Nanase Nishino, has been postponed, as well as the airing schedule of Suits Season 2, starring Yuto Nakajima and Yuko Araki, has been suspended. Meanwhile, NHK announced that the schedule for three drama series would be postponed as a result of the pandemic. "The broadcast date will be announced on the program guide and website as soon as it is decided," said the station.

On April 19, 2020, TV Tokyo, MediaNet & ShoPro announced that the Pokémon anime series would be going on hiatus, with production temporarily suspended. Reruns of old episodes began airing from April 26 to May 31, 2020; production staff later announced that new episodes would resume airing on June 7, 2020. In addition, production for many Toei anime shows was suspended due to the pandemic, including Healin' Good Pretty Cure (at Episode 12) and Digimon Adventure: (at Episode 3). As of 19 April 2020, Fuji TV, Toei Animation confirmed that the One Piece anime series would be going on recess, with production temporarily postponing new episodes and reruns of older episodes taking their place. On April 26, 2020, Nippon Animation announced that broadcasting of new episodes of the Chibi Maruko-chan anime had been suspended indefinitely as a result of the virus first reaching Tokyo. As a side note, as of April 26, 2020, there were a number of anime series with production pauses due to difficulties in supply and production, including some series like Black Clover, Boruto: Naruto Next Generations, Duel Masters King, Kingdom (Season 3), Major 2nd Season 2.

As of 9 May 2020, it was reported that nine anime series had completed production during the public health crisis.

Malaysia 

Malaysia suspended all active filming in March. On 19 May, the government has given the green light for the filming industry to resume its activities after Hari Raya Aidilfitri.

Philippines 

Television talk, reality, variety and game shows in the Philippines temporarily filmed without a live audience. TAPE Inc. announced on March 9 that it would stop admitting live audiences for their variety show Eat Bulaga!, which airs on GMA Network; ABS-CBN followed suit, announcing on March 10 that they would do the same for their television shows including It's Showtime, Banana Sundae, Magandang Buhay, the second season of the Philippine version of I Can See Your Voice and ASAP. GMA Network then followed suit again with Wowowin (including its Saturday primetime edition), All-Out Sundays, Centerstage, The Boobay and Tekla Show, Mars Pa More and GMA News TV's Idol sa Kusina and Tonight with Arnold Clavio.

On March 14, 2020, ABS-CBN and GMA Network both announced that they will suspend production on their respective drama and live entertainment shows effective March 15 (the same day a quarantine declared by President Rodrigo Duterte was enacted in Metro Manila and Cainta, Rizal). Hence, ABS-CBN would air its previously aired shows temporarily in place for primetime viewing: 100 Days to Heaven, May Bukas Pa and On the Wings of Love. Additionally, the network gave its iWant TV series I Am U on its television debut. The following week, Walang Hanggan, The Legal Wife and Got to Believe were re-aired on the afternoon programming block, additionally, Wildflower, Tubig at Langis and the 2018 remake of the Chinese version of Meteor Garden on the primetime block. GMA Network followed suit with Ika-6 na Utos, Encantadia, Kambal, Karibal, My Husband's Lover, Alyas Robin Hood and Onanay.

On March 18, 2020, GMA News TV and CNN Philippines announced that they will temporarily go off-air beginning March 19, with the latter going off as the Worldwide Corporate Center in Mandaluyong, where their newsroom and studios are based, is being disinfected after a confirmed case in the offices of one of the building's tenants. The two networks eventually returned on March 20 and 23 respectively, with GMA News TV making way for a temporary full-time video simulcast of DZBB-AM and its studio programming.

In an unrelated matter, ABS-CBN's broadcast licence was not renewed by its expiry date by Congress, and the company's free television and radio stations were hence forced off the air by the National Telecommunications Commission on May 5, 2020, to much domestic controversy and further worldwide attention when the European Parliament released a resolution that could lead to the revocation of GSP certifications of Filipino Products if the cases of journalist Maria Ressa were not dropped alongside the denial of the Philippine congress to grant ABS-CBN a fresh 25-year broadcasting franchise. The license revocation is believed to involve the network's critical news coverage of President Duterte's administration, along with overall inaction from the Congress of the Philippines to renew their broadcast license since the matter came up in 2016.  Although the reason for the closure is not directly due to COVID-19, some figures have expressed concern about its impact on public efforts to contain the pandemic.  In a statement, ABS-CBN management said that "Millions of Filipinos will lose their source of news and entertainment when ABS-CBN is ordered to go off-air on TV and radio tonight (5 May 2020) when people need crucial and timely information as the nation deals with the COVID-19 pandemic".

Furthermore, Albay Representative Joey Salceda warned that the network's shutdown could add up to 2,600 COVID-19 cases, as many viewers would lose a vital source of information on how to keep themselves safe during the pandemic. Vice President Leni Robredo (who does not share Duterte's party affiliation) questioned the move as she believes the network's operations have helped in efforts to contain COVID-19 more than the country's offshore gaming operations, and added that the shutdown could "cost lives on top of the thousands who will lose their jobs". The company's premium network ABS-CBN News Channel is unaffected as a cable-only network, continuing to provide full news updates, along with ABS-CBN's social media accounts and YouTube channels, and its international networks, including The Filipino Channel. On May 8, 2020, the newscast of the network's flagship news programme, TV Patrol began to broadcast on ABS-CBN TV Plus channels TeleRadyo and Cine Mo!.

Pantawid ng Pag-ibig: At Home Together Concert was a benefit concert, broadcast on March 22.

Following the downgrade to general community quarantine, most shows continued their production with safety protocols, such as lock-in tapings in which artists are isolated in a bubble setup and are required to stay in nearby hotels for the duration of the taping cycles and wearing of face shields for certain in-studio programs.

Singapore 

On February 7, the government announced that the framework scheme Disease Outbreak Response System Condition (DORSCON) was raised to Orange, while Suria held a live concert special celebrating the channel's 20th Anniversary, which was the last live program to have a live audience, among which President of Singapore Halimah Yacob was ushered as guest-of-honor. The last three episodes of the 26th season of another live-broadcast Channel 8 game show, The Sheng Siong Show (with the first episode airing a day after on the 8th), began suspending their studio audience, though contestants are still invited on-stage for studio segments including the Thousandfold Cash Reward; previously live-broadcast programs airing at the time such as Te:Ra Seh 4.0 and Sinar Lebaran 2020, also followed suit and continued production without live audience.

After Singapore enforced its lockdown restrictions (dubbed "Circuit Breaker") from April 7 to June 1, Suria and Vasantham both began their broadcasts earlier at 9am starting April 8, and new local shows featuring celebrities premiered on morning and afternoon timeslots on April 9. However, some reruns on the afternoon were pre-empt on certain days to broadcast update messages delivered by Prime Minister Lee Hsien Loong. On April 12, Channel 5 brought the airing for the 2019 film Spider-Man: Far From Home earlier as opposed to a 2-3 year average gap as other films recently aired. Prior to the period, medical-themed dramas Big White Duel and My Guardian Angels were premiered as 7:30pm and 9pm dramas on Channel 8 respectively to raise awareness. Another medical-theme drama, You Can Be an Angel 3 began reruns from May 29 at 5:30pm, after the finales of My Guardian Angels and Big White Duel on May 15 and 26, respectively.

Many other Singaporean shows have also postponed production or delayed broadcast to a later date, such as the monthly crime documentary television series CrimeWatch, annual Star Awards ceremony (initially on April 26 before being moved to 2021) and the 27th season of The Sheng Siong Show (postponed from May 9 to June 6). Since the suspension of production of local dramas, Channel 8 had begun airing international dramas asn replacements for local drama series on the 7:30pm and 9pm, starting with Heart and Greed and Sky Castle, as well as the Mandarin dubbing drama Titoudao: Inspired by the True Story of a Wayang Star.

On April 25 at 7:55pm (SGT), all Mediacorp channels aired a short five-minute sing-along music video of celebrities and musicians singing a rendition of Kit Chan's "Home" as a tribute to commemorate the efforts of frontline and migrant workers during the outbreak. On June 1 at 7:30pm (SGT), a second video short titled Stronger As One was broadcast on all Mediacorp channels, paying tribute to the current events and featured the sing-along segment of Stephanie Sun's "We Will Get There".

Both pay televisions by StarHub and SingTel (and along with their respective apps StarHub GO and CAST) also announced free preview screening during the lockdown from March 20 to June 1, and from April 1 to June 30, respectively. On June 2, after the lockdown was eased in Singapore, StarHub further extended the free preview until June 30.

South Korea 

Many shows continued as planned, however traveling or outside shows such as SBS' Running Man, KBS 2TV's 2 Days & 1 Night, and MBC's Real Man 300 were suspended. Many shows accepted fewer spectators, to allow for social distancing, such as KBS 2TV's Immortal Songs, You Hee-yeol's Sketchbook, and MBC's King of Mask Singer. Mnet's competition series such as Road to Kingdom (a sequel to Queendom) and Good Girl changed completely, using one set instead of two, and have no live shows. They also changed the process of voting on the shows, so only competitors may vote.

In music shows such as SBS MTV's The Show, MBC M's Show Champion, Mnet's M Countdown, KBS 2TV's Music Bank, MBC's Show! Music Core, and SBS's Inkigayo, there are also no spectators. Instead, they used pre-recorded screaming and clapping.

Latin America

Argentina 

Since the start of the national lockdown in Argentina, broadcast television in the country saw a 30% increase of viewership during the week between 17 and 22 March. The networks increased the airtime of talk shows and news programming, while reality shows were still in production.

A fundraising special show aimed to the Red Cross for supplying hospitals and health centers aired throughout all six broadcast networks on 5 April. The show, called "United for Argentina", included celebrities and famous people from the Argentine media. Donations reached a total of $87,938,624.

The only telenovela that was airing on broadcast television before the beginning of the pandemic, Separadas (from El Trece), was removed from the schedule after its 19 March airing and production was suspended temporarily. Two months later, producing company Pol-Ka definitely cancelled the show due to "economic reasons", leaving Argentine television without any scripted programming.

The first cases of COVID-19 reached Argentine television in June. Producers from Telefe's game show El Precio Justo were diagnosed, making the show to enter on hiatus and schedule reruns to air instead. El Precio Justo'''s hostess Lizy Tagliani later reported that she was diagnosed positive for COVID-19. Telefe also announced that talk show Cortá por Lozano would be broadcast with the hostess and panelists from their homes as a preventive measure. News channel C5N had to implement a protocol to prevent new infections after one of their journalists tested positive for COVID-19.

 Brazil 

TV Globo shifted their programming schedule by expanding their regular news programming and cutting entertainment programming. This included the suspension of the filming of the network's telenovelas for the safety of cast and crew. Because of this, the currently-running 9pm telenovela Amor de Mãe was replaced by the 2011 series Fina Estampa, the 7:30pm current series Salve-se Quem Puder was replaced with the 2015 series Totalmente Demais and debut of the upcoming 6pm series Nos Tempos do Imperador was postponed, with the 2017 series Novo Mundo airing on its place. Journalists for the network over the age of sixty were told to telework.

 Mexico 

In Mexico, as the health crisis expands, it seems that there will be inevitable changes to the broadcasting schedule. Unfortunately, as the health crisis has expanded in Spain and Brazil, it is difficult to broadcast overseas sports leagues, and it is expected that there will be some influence on the production of telenovelas. In addition, since the number of diagnostic tests of per population is relatively small, it is unlikely that there will be a small number of Mexican broadcasters among the suspected patient or potentially infected population, as it is difficult to say that the situation inside Mexico is better than other developing countries. However, it is believed that the minimum number of broadcasting personnel is contributing to the operation of broadcasting companies, as all broadcasting stations seek to slow dawn and minimize and spread infection.

 Anglo-America 
 Canada 

As in other regions, the pandemic has forced the modification of television production in Canada, including programs being reformatted to not use studio audiences or be produced remotely, and the suspension of filming for international scripted productions taking place in the country — such as Vancouver-based productions of The CW's Batwoman, The Flash, Riverdale, and Supernatural,  as well as Snowpiercer and See. On March 24, 2020, production of the eighth season of Big Brother Canada ended, and a season finale aired on April 1 with no winner declared.

Both the Juno Awards and the Canadian Screen Awards, which were scheduled to be televised in March, were cancelled. The Canadian Screen Awards ultimately announced their winners via livestreaming in the week of May 25 to 28, while the Junos were presented in an online event on June 29. The 22nd Quebec Cinema Awards were also cancelled, with organizers announcing winners via livestreaming on June 10.

Due to the suspension of the National Hockey League (NHL), CBC Television replaced its weekly Hockey Night in Canada broadcast with Movie Night in Canada, a double bill of Canadian films. With virtually all live sports cancelled, TSN and Sportsnet both opted to rerun various past sports broadcasts, including the entire 2019 championship playoff run of the Toronto Raptors. In addition to Movie Night in Canada, CBC Television also launched a number of other special short-run series during the pandemic, including What're You At?, a remotely-produced Sunday-evening talk show with Tom Power, and Hot Docs at Home, a Thursday night series which broadcast several feature documentary films which had been slated to premiere at the cancelled Hot Docs Canadian International Documentary Festival.

To widen their availability, the CBC and Bell Media made their news channels, CBC News Network, CP24, CTV News Channel, and Ici RDI available as free previews on pay television providers, and freely available for streaming online without TV Everywhere authentication. Due to resource constraints, the CBC temporarily replaced its local evening newscasts with a simulcast from CBC News Network combining content from local and national journalists from across the country, a decision that was criticized by the Premier of Prince Edward Island Dennis King (CBC News: Compass is the province's only local daily television news program). By the end of March, however, local news service began to be restored in most markets.

The benefit event Stronger Together, Tous Ensemble aired across most major Canadian broadcasters on April 26; with around 11.5 million viewers, it was the most-watched non-sports telecast in Canadian history. On May 22, CTV aired the special Unsinkable Youth, hosted by Silken Laumann and Maitreyi Ramakrishnan in partnership with Kids Help Phone to promote awareness of youth mental health in the wake of the pandemic. and WE Celebrate: Class of 2020 on June 6, hosted by Lilly Singh.

In mid-August 2020, it was reported that local unions had resolved an impasse with U.S. studios over safety and testing protocols for their Vancouver-based productions.

 United States 

The COVID-19 pandemic has been the most impactful event to U.S. television production since the 2007–08 Writers Guild of America strike, which disrupted nearly all scripted television production. Upon the beginning of restrictions and stay-at-home orders that resulted in an industry-wide shutdown of nearly all television production, networks were dependent on their remaining inventory of completed programs that had not yet aired (resulting in some completed programs being delayed to air as contingencies in place of other programs), the remaining completed episodes of series whose production was interrupted, programs designed for or capable of being adapted for remote production — including talk shows, unscripted programs, one-off entertainment specials (such as the multi-network simulcast One World: Together at Home) and esports events as alternatives to cancelled or delayed professional sports.On May 22, Georgia became the first U.S. state to release guidelines for safety protocols during film and television production. California began to authorize the resumption of film and television production on June 12; the Big Three networks' soap operas were among the first to resume production (with The Bold and the Beautiful resuming first-run episodes in July). Tyler Perry completed production on the next seasons of his BET dramas Sistas and The Oval in July and August respectively at his Atlanta-based Tyler Perry Studios complex using a "bubble" strategy, with Sistas being the first U.S. scripted primetime series to complete a season of production under COVID-19 safety protocols.

Some late-night talk shows began to migrate from home-based formats in July, returning to new or re-configured studios with no studio audience, and continued use of remote interviews for guests. Other reality series that were suspended or delayed due to the pandemic, such as America's Got Talent, Big Brother, and Love Island, also began the process of returning to air with additional safety measures in place (and in the case of AGT and Love Island, being filmed from different locations than they usually are).

The fall schedules of the major broadcast networks have been impacted by production delays and other contingencies, relying more on acquisitions and imports new to U.S. broadcast TV, deferred and/or postponed summer series, and other non-scripted output (which have a faster turnaround time) to fill timeslots until scripted series can return to air.

 Europe 
On 18 March 2020, the European Broadcasting Union (EBU) announced that the Eurovision Song Contest 2020 would be cancelled; it was scheduled to take place in Rotterdam, the Netherlands on 12, 14 and 16 May. Rotterdam remained host of the 2021 contest on 18, 20, and 22 May 2021, and countries were required to submit new entries; many countries announced plans to retain their selected artists for 2020 with new songs for 2021. The EBU announced that it would air a non-competitive special on 16 May (the original date of the 2020 final), Eurovision: Europe Shine a Light, featuring the artists that were set to participate.

The Junior Eurovision Song Contest 2020 in Warsaw, Poland went ahead in a remote format, with most acts performing from studios in their home country. In September 2020, the EBU announced that the Eurovision Song Contest 2021 would have contingency plans allowing for such a format as a last resort, but with other options available, including a less-crowded production with a limited audience, and the option for countries to perform remotely if their act cannot travel to the Netherlands.

 Belgium 

A lockdown in Belgium influenced local studio Woestijnvis (of The Mole fame) to produce The Container Cup, a sports competition series where equipment is delivered to contestants' homes in camera-equipped shipping containers. Proving popular, the series has been optioned and sold internationally in markets such as Italy, Spain, and the United States.

 France 

 Germany 

As the public health crisis expanded significantly in Germany, there were cases where scheduled broadcasts were postponed or suspended and proceeded without the audience.

 Netherlands 

Dutch reality series Wie is de Mol?, which films its finale episode in front of a crowd in Vondelpark, decided to film without an audience for its twentieth season. Starting on March 15, satirical television programme  Zondag met Lubach began filming without an audience. Production of the daily soap Goede tijden, slechte tijden suspended with the show's channel deciding to broadcast four episodes per week from March 23 instead of five.

 Spain 

Since the second week of March all programs are filmed without audiences. The 11th season of music competition show Operación Triunfo went on hiatus as a precautionary measure over the ongoing pandemic. Comedy programs Late Motiv, El intermedio and El Hormiguero have decided to make low cost programs involving fewer people and with heavy use of videoconferences to avoid contagions.

Also, TV game shows like the Spanish adaptation of The Chase (El Cazador) were suspended or are using archived episodes like Saber y ganar, Ahora caigo, ¡Boom! and La ruleta de la suerte.

As well, TV series are suspended and/or in hiatus, like the recordings of the final season of La que se avecina or the 2nd season of Señoras del (h)ampa. Veneno, biographical series about the life and death of Cristina Ortiz, La Veneno, will only premiere in Atresplayer Premium with 1 of the 8 episodes on 29 March 2020, leaving the rest of episodes unaired until further notice.

 United Kingdom 

The BBC postponed filming for a celebrity version of Race Across the World that was set to start filming in April. The following week, the organisation suspended production of Peaky Blinders and Line of Duty. Ant & Dec's Saturday Night Takeaway cancelled a finale taping set at Walt Disney World following the park's closure. On 15 March, filming for the second season of the Netflix series The Witcher  in the United Kingdom was suspended for two weeks. Starting on the week of 16 March, Jeremy Vine, Loose Women, and QI filmed without studio audiences. On 18 March, the BBC suspended production of its medical dramas and soap operas, including EastEnders, Casualty, Doctors, and Holby City.

The BBC announced that it would devote resources to providing educational programmes as a supplement to cancelled classes beginning 20 April, including 14 weeks of "core subject learning". This included Bitesize Daily (daily 20-minute programmes on the iPlayer for six age groups), a weekday strand on BBC Four catered towards GCSE and A-levels, and other digital content via BBC Sounds and Red Button.

On 23 April, the BBC held a charity appeal titled The Big Night In, in collaboration between Children in Need and Comic Relief. Chef Jamie Oliver produced a new programme, Keep Cooking and Carry On, for Channel 4, and Charlie Brooker produced a one-off BBC Two special, Charlie Brooker's Antiviral Wipe, to satirize the impact of the pandemic and the British government response.

On 12 May, it was reported that the British government would allow scripted television production to resume if safety precautions are instituted. Emmerdale and Coronation Street were among the first scripted series to resume. In July 2020, The War of the Worlds became the first British drama series to resume production. Several non-scripted programs normally produced in other countries were re-located domestically, including I'm a Celebrity...Get Me Out of Here! — whose twentieth series moved from Australia to Gwrych Castle in Wales, and The Wall – which moved to Wembley Arena after having filmed its first series at an Endemol Shine hub in Poland. Sky Studios is pausing production of all domestic dramas that involve international filming through at least spring 2021. On 13 December 2021, the BFI announced that a record £4bn recovery was spent on television production in the UK. TV production slumped during the impact of the COVID-19 pandemic. The £4bn in 2021 was compared to the £2.3bn figures spent in the same period between 2018-19.

 MENASA 

 Bangladesh 
Due to the COVID-19 pandemic, most of televising productions came to a halt in Bangladesh. The state television re-aired old shows such as Songsoptok, Ei Shob Din Ratri, Bohubrihi, and Kothao Keu Nei. Old episodes of Ityadi were also re-aired.

 India 

All television and film and production in India was halted on 19 March 2020.

According to Chief Minister K. Chandrasekhar Rao, filming, post-production work, and movie theaters began to reopen in phases beginning in June.

Tamil satellite channel Sun TV abruptly officially ended four of its running television soap operas such as Chocolate, Azhagu, Kalyana Parisu and Tamil Selvi owing to COVID-19 lockdown in India which also resulted in inter-district ban and due to artists refusing to shoot for the relevant television serials amid COVID-19 fears. Alongside Sun TV, other satellite television channels Star Vijay, Zee Tamil and Colors Tamil also started airing old television serials and movies from 23 March 2020. Tamil Nadu state government granted permission to start shooting for the television soap operas in the mid of May 2020 (21 May 2020) with allowing only a maximum of 20 cast artists in indoors and cautioned to maintain strict health guidelines during shooting procedures. As of 25 May 2020, shooting of television soap operas commenced but government in Tamil Nadu imposed another lockdown between 19 June to 30 June which resulted in yet another halting of television production. However, on 7 July 2020, most of the shooting of television soap operas resumed again to telecast all new episodes.

Sun TV Network revealed that it will telecast new episodes of their current television soap operas such as Kalyana Veedu, Nayagi, Roja, Kanmani and few others with effect from 27 July 2020. Star Vijay also stated that its prime time television soap operas such as Pandian Stores, Bharathi Kannamma, Ayutha Ezhuthu, Kaatrin Mozhi, Thaenmozhi B.A, [[Mouna Raagam (TV series)|Mouna Raagam]] and Baakiyalakshmi will be telecast with new episodes from 27 July 2020. Zee Tamil also confirmed that their prime time and non-prime time serials such as Sembaruthi, Yaaradi Nee Mohini, Oru Oorla Oru Rajakumari, Gokulathil Seethai, Poove Poochoodava, Rettai Roja, Raja Magal, Endrendrum Punnagai, Sathya and Neethane Enthan Ponvasantham will also be telecast with new episodes from 27 July 2020.

Saudi Arabia 
Ahlan Simsim: Friends Time is a program that will be broadcast across the Middle East and North Africa, featuring characters from the Sesame Street co-production having a playdate over a video call service.

Turkey 

Following a campaign started by the cast and crew members of various TV series, many networks temporarily suspended the production of their TV shows and programs until further notice. A few number of TV series, however, still continue to be produced.

Sub-Saharan Africa

Ethiopia

Nigeria

South Africa 

Many telenovelas announced an indefinite filming break, causing shows that were planning to shoot to cancel production as television programs faced a sudden reschedule. As South Africa began to ease restrictions starting on May 1, telenovelas and the TV industry as a whole were allowed to film, but only following social distancing rules. During the pandemic, TV news thrived as most South Africans received their information about the pandemic leading to increased ratings to news meda.

Affected productions 
Some shows continue with production but without a studio audience, and some shows would have reruns, since some shows could finish their seasons earlier than expected due to being unable to finish production for telecasting.

Suspended and/or postponed

Unscripted

Scripted

Talk shows

Anime 
On March 18, 2020; Funimation announced that their same-day English dubbing and broadcast of domestic Japanese anime would be delayed for the remainder of the Winter season as well as upcoming seasons, but they stated that simulcasts in English subtitles will continue as scheduled. Later on April 11, 2020; Funimation announced that their same-day dubs slowly resumed production on a work-from-home basis. On March 27, 2020, Crunchyroll announced that they would also delay English dubbing of their licensed anime series as a result of the pandemic. On April 2, 2020, Sentai Filmworks' HIDIVE announced that they will also be delaying dubbed titles until further notice. In early April 2020, many anime series were revealed to be postponed from their intended broadcast dates due to Japan declaring a state of emergency on April 6, 2020, because of the increase of cases in the nation. On April 19, 2020, TV Tokyo, MediaNet & ShoPro announced that the Pokémon anime series will be going on hiatus, with production on the TV anime series suspended, and in its place it will rerun the old episodes on all networks and on TV Tokyo starting April 26, 2020 due to the complicated COVID-19 pandemic in Japan. It has not been stated when new episodes will air, but the staff said that they will make an announcement once they receive information on a return date. On April 20, 2020, Toei Animation announced that their shows: One Piece, PreCure, and Digimon, were also suspended. Production of Sazae-san was also suspended, while studios relying on computer-generated imagery faced excessive bandwidth use when employees at home tried to access company servers at the same time.

Modified
These tables include series that adopted remotely-filmed and home-based productions for one or more episodes, or are using studio-based productions with additional safety protocols, such as reduced staff, lack of studio audience, and/or visible social distancing.

Unscripted

Talk shows

Scripted

Show reruns

Anime

Drama series

Seasons ended prematurely

New productions

Series cancelled due to factors brought upon by the pandemic

See also 
 Impact of the COVID-19 pandemic on cinema

References 

 
2020 in television